Prasophyllum plumiforme, commonly known as the dainty leek orchid, is a species of orchid endemic to the south-west of Western Australia. It is a small leek orchid with a single smooth, tubular leaf and up to fifty or more tiny cream-coloured or greenish-yellow flowers on a tall flowering stem.

Description
As with others in the genus, the flowers are inverted so that the labellum is above the column rather than below it. The petals are about the same size as the lateral sepals and turn forwards. The edges of the labellum are crinkled and there is a green callus along its centre. Flowering occurs from September to November. This leek orchid resembles P. ovale but is taller and has smaller, less crowded flowers.

Taxonomy and naming
Prasophyllum plumiforme was first formally described in 1882 by Robert FitzGerald and the description was published in The Gardeners' Chronicle. The specific epithet (plumiforme) is derived from the Latin word pluma meaning "soft feather" or "down" with the suffix -forme meaning "shape", referring to the feather-like labellum.

Distribution and habitat
The dainty leek orchid is widespread and often common in woodland and shrubland between Kalbarri and Israelite Bay.

Conservation
Prasophyllum plumiforme is classified as "not threatened" by the Western Australian Government Department of Parks and Wildlife.

References

External links 
 

plumiforme
Endemic flora of Western Australia
Endemic orchids of Australia
Plants described in 1882